The 11109 / 10 Jhansi–Lucknow Intercity Express is an Express train belonging to Indian Railways – North Central Railways that runs between  & Lucknow NE in India.

It operates as train number 11109 from Jhansi Junction to Lucknow NE and as train number 11110 in the reverse direction serving the state of Uttar Pradesh .

Coaches

The 11109 / 10 Jhansi–Lucknow Intercity Express has 2 AC Chair Car, 7 Second Class seating, 2 General Unreserved & 2 SLR (Seating cum Luggage Rake) Coaches. It does not carry a pantry car.
 
As is customary with most train services in India, coach composition may be amended at the discretion of Indian Railways depending on demand.

Service

As the average speed of the train is below , as per Indian Railways rules, its fare does not include a Superfast surcharge.

Routeing

The 11109 / 10 Jhansi–Lucknow Intercity Express runs from Jhansi Junction via Moth, Orai, Pukhrayan,  to Lucknow NE  .

Traction

As the route is fully electrified, a Jhansi-based WAP-4 is the traditional power for this train and hauls the train for its entire journey  .

Rake Sharing

The 11109 / 10 Jhansi–Lucknow Intercity Express shares its rake with the 22453 / 54 Meerut City–Lucknow Rajya Rani Express.

Operation

11109 Jhansi–Lucknow Intercity Express runs from Jhansi Junctio} on a daily basis reaching Lucknow NE the same day .
11110 Lucknow–Jhansi Intercity Express runs from Lucknow NE on a daily basis reaching Jhansi Junction the same day .

References 

 http://indian-railway.swargate.com/Train-Time-Table/jhansi-lucknow-intercity-express/11109
 http://indian-railway.swargate.com/Train-Time-Table/lucknow-jhansi-intercity-express/11110
 http://timesofindia.indiatimes.com/city/lucknow/Shatabdi-Exp-on-Lucknow-Junction-from-April-29/articleshow/32327591.cms
 http://irfca.org/apps/locolinks/show/134
 https://www.youtube.com/watch?v=GHYbdBPIs3Y

External links

Intercity Express (Indian Railways) trains
Passenger trains originating from Lucknow
Trains from Jhansi